John McKee may refer to:
 John McKee (politician) (1771–1832), American politician
 John McKee (American football) (1877–1950), American football coach and physician
 John McKee (philanthropist) (1821–1902), African-American property magnate
 John McKee (rugby union coach), New Zealand rugby union coach
 John McKee (rugby union, born 2000), Irish rugby union player